The World Socialist Web Site (WSWS) is the website of the International Committee of the Fourth International (ICFI). It describes itself as an "online newspaper of the international Trotskyist movement". The WSWS publishes articles and analysis of news and events from around the world, updated daily. The site also includes coverage of the history of working-class political and organized labor movements.

About 
The WSWS was established on February 14, 1998. The site was redesigned on October 22, 2008, and then again on October 1, 2020.

The WSWS supports and helps campaign for the Socialist Equality Parties in elections. The site has no advertisements, except for material from Mehring Books, the ICFI's publishing arm. Instead, it sustains itself through the donations of readers and supporters. David North serves as Chairman of the site's International Editorial Board.

Content 
The WSWS publishes articles on politics, finance and economics, culture, police violence, racism, war, media and information technology, corporate power, history, and labor issues. It also regularly reviews films, television and online series, music, art and artists, and books and authors. 

The WSWS periodically undertakes focused political campaigns, during which numerous articles, videos, interviews, and perspectives are published on the topic. Campaigns undertaken include defending Julian Assange, Chelsea Manning, and Edward Snowden, civil rights and free speech, and the opposition to utility shutoffs and bankruptcy in Detroit.

Demotion in Google searches 
According to Julianne Tvetan writing in In These Times, in July 2017 the WSWS drew attention to new Google search algorithms intended to remove fake news, which WSWS believed to be a form of censorship by Google. Using evidence from SEMrush, an analytics suite for search engine optimization, the WSWS alleged that several sites, such as AlterNet and Globalresearch.ca, had received reduced traffic from Google due to changes in its search algorithm. According to the WSWS, between late April 2017 and the beginning of August 2017 its Google search traffic fell by 67%. Google said that it had not deliberately targeted any particular website, and Google vice-president Ben Gomes wrote that Google had "adjusted [its] signals to help surface more authoritative pages and demote low-quality content." According to WSWS, the documentary film-maker John Pilger offered his support to a webinar involving David North and Chris Hedges about the issue because he said the website, along with WikiLeaks, Consortium News, Global Research, Democracy Now!, and CounterPunch, were increasingly being tagged as "offensive" by Google. Matt Taibbi also commented on what he called a "massive drop" in traffic experienced by "small, independent media outlets on both the left and the right" such as WSWS.

The 1619 Project
In 2019, WSWS received considerable attention for its criticisms of the New York Times''' The 1619 Project, which aimed to reframe American history by placing the consequences of slavery and the contributions of Black Americans at the center of the country's national narrative. WSWS described the project as "one component of a deliberate effort to inject racial politics into the heart of the 2020 elections and foment divisions among the working class." According to The Washington Post,On Dec. 16 [2020], Wall Street Journal opinion columnist Elliot Kaufman brought into the mainstream criticisms of the 1619 Project from four historians who had been questioning it for months on the World Socialist website, a fringe news publication founded upon the principles of Trotskyism. Some of what those professors wrote had gained momentum in the Twitterverse and sparked discussion about their analysis of the 1619 Project. WSWS received considerable praise from right-wing commentators for its criticisms. For example, the National Review described it as "one of the few media outlets examining the 1619 Project in critical detail" and extensively cited contributions by historians Gordon S. Wood and James M. McPherson; the research director of the right-wing American Institute for Economic Research told the Dartmouth Review that there was a "strange alliance" between conservative historians and the Trotskyists of WSWS, who he described as "old-school historians" following the data; and Michael Barone in the conservative New York Post gave positive attention to historian Sean Wilentz's criticisms of the project in WSWS.

 Criticism 
In an article for the socialist magazine New Politics, the Lebanese Trotskyist academic Gilbert Achcar described the WSWS as "pro-Putin, pro-Assad and 'left-wing' propaganda" combined with "gutter journalism ... run by a 'Trotskyist' cult ... which perpetuates a long worn-out tradition of inter-Trotskyist sectarian quarrels in fulfilling its role as apologist for Putin, Assad, and their friends."Reason has said that a 2020 viral false account of New York University agreeing to racially segregated student housing was partially due to an inaccurate report on the World Socialist Website. Reason'' commented: "As a socialist publication, TWSW sometimes criticizes the progressive left for being preoccupied with issues unrelated to class."

References

External links 
 
 The Bulletin (1964–1974) Internet Archive, Marxists Internet Archive, www.marxists.org

International Committee of the Fourth International
Socialist publications
Socialist newspapers
American political websites
Multilingual news services
American news websites
Internet properties established in 1998
Trotskyist works